She Be Wild (foaled March 7, 2007, in Kentucky), is an American Thoroughbred racehorse.

Background
She Be Wild was sired by Offlee Wild, who was sired by Wild Again. She is out of the mare Trapping, who is by Seeking The Gold, a son of the influential Mr. Prospector.

Racing career
She Be Wild made her racing debut at age two in 2009 with a 7¼-length maiden special weight, followed up by an allowance race victory.  On August 8, she won the Top Flight Stakes by 5¼-lengths and on September 5, she won the Grade III Arlington-Washington Lassie Stakes. Unbeaten in three starts, she was then entered, and made the heavy betting favorite, for the $500,000 Grade I Alcibiades Stakes at Keeneland but finished second to Negligee.

On November 6, 2009, She Be Wild won the Breeders' Cup Juvenile Fillies. She was voted American Champion Two-Year-Old Filly for 2009.

She Be Wild raced twice without success in 2010 before being retired from racing. Upon her retirement, it was announced that she would be bred to top stallion Tapit. On February 1, 2012, she gave birth to her first foal, a chestnut filly named Shebealittlewild. She was bred back to Tapit, and foaled a gray filly named Propositioned on February 3, 2013. She then visited Smart Strike, producing a dark bay filly on February 12, 2014. She has not yet been named.

Pedigree

References
 She Be Wild at the NTRA
 She Be Wild at Breeders' Cup.com

External links
 She Be Wild's pedigree and stats

2007 racehorse births
Racehorses bred in Kentucky
Racehorses trained in the United States
Breeders' Cup Juvenile Fillies winners
Thoroughbred family 2-o
Eclipse Award winners